Choi Jung-Won (Hangul: 최정원, Hanja: 崔貞洹) (born March 16, 1990) is a South Korean female short track speed skater.

See also 
 South Korea at the 2010 Winter Olympics.

References 
 

1990 births
Living people
South Korean female short track speed skaters
Universiade medalists in short track speed skating
Universiade gold medalists for South Korea
Universiade silver medalists for South Korea
Competitors at the 2009 Winter Universiade
21st-century South Korean women